Gadwal Assembly constituency is a constituency of Telangana Legislative Assembly, India. It is one of 14 constituencies in Mahbubnagar district. It is part of Nagarkurnool Lok Sabha constituency.

Bandla Krishna Mohan Reddy of Telangana Rashtra Samithi is representing the constituency. His wife is Bandla Jyoti.

Mandals
The Assembly Constituency presently comprises the following Mandals:

Members of Legislative Assembly

Election results

Telangana Legislative Assembly election, 2018

Telangana Legislative Assembly election, 2014

See also
 List of constituencies of Telangana Legislative Assembly

References

Assembly constituencies of Telangana
Mahbubnagar district